Jinneng Holding Equipment Manufacturing Group Company Limited, formerly name Shanxi Jincheng Anthracite Mining Group Co., Ltd. (JAMG) is a Chinese state-owned coal mining conglomerate based in Jincheng, Shanxi. JAMG was ranked 386th in 2016 Fortune Global 500. The company also known as Jin Coal Group in China, which "Jin" was the short name of both Jincheng and Shanxi Province, as both named after the ancient Jin. Jincheng was located in one of the 13 important coal mining sites of China, namely "Jin East", which fellow state-owned enterprise Yangquan Coal Industry Group and Lu'an Mining Industry Group were also located in "Jin East".

According to a publication of the National Energy Administration, JAMG had a coal mining capability of 54.55 million tons in 2015, despite the list was incomplete. (The figure also included the mines from Taiyuan Coal Gasification Group) According to the company itself, the company produced 70.4 million tons of coal in 2015.

According to the International Energy Agency, JAMG was ranked 11th in 2006 in China by sales mass. According to UNESCO, the group had one of the representative coal gasification plant in China in 2007, with an output of 100,000 tons. The group also had the world largest coal mine methane power plant of 120 MegaWatts, at the Sihe Mine. The engine of the power plant was constructed by Caterpillar and the project was partly financed by a loan from Asia Development Bank and the Prototype Carbon Fund that was managed by the World Bank.

History
Shanxi Jincheng Anthracite Mining Group was founded in 1958 as Jincheng Mining Bureau. In 2000 it was incorporated as a limited company. In 2011 Shanxi SASAC entrusted JAMG to manage Taiyuan Coal Gasification Group.

A backdoor listing was planned for a subsidiary of JAMG, which produces coal mine methane. The listed company would acquire the subsidiary by paying cash and issuing new shares to JAMG. The assets of coal gas would sold back from the listed company to Taiyuan Coal Gasification Group. After the deal, JAMG would owned the listed company for 49.89%, followed by Taiyuan Coal Gasification Group for 16.66%. Additional new shares would be issued to other parties in order to dilute the effect of aforementioned deal, which JAMG and Taiyuan Coal Gasification Group may owned 40.05% and 13.38% stake respectively, with new investors owned 20%.

Shareholders
The latter acquired the stake by debt-to-equity swap. On 29 January 2015 JAMG bought back 3.61% stake from China Construction Bank. The treasury stock was than canceled in mid-2015.

References

External links

 
 Jinneng Holding Equipment Manufacturing Group Company Limited Official Website

Coal companies of China
Government agencies established in 1958
1958 establishments in China
Companies owned by the provincial government of China
Government-owned companies of China
Chinese companies established in 2000
Energy companies established in 2000
Non-renewable resource companies established in 2000
Companies based in Shanxi
Holding companies of China
Jincheng
Natural gas companies of China
2020 mergers and acquisitions
Announced mergers and acquisitions